This is a list of corticosteroid esters, including esters of steroidal glucocorticoids and mineralocorticoids.

Esters of natural corticosteroids

Desoxycortone esters

 Desoxycortone acetate (deoxycortone acetate; desoxycorticosterone acetate)
 Desoxycortone cypionate (deoxycortone cypionate; desoxycorticosterone cypionate)
 Desoxycortone enanthate (deoxycortone enanthate; deoxycorticosterone enanthate)
 Desoxycortone glucoside (deoxycortone glucoside; deoxycorticosterone glucoside)
 Desoxycortone pivalate (deoxycortone pivalate; deoxycorticosterone pivalate)

Hydrocortisone esters

 Benzodrocortisone (hydrocortisone 17-benzoate)
 Hydrocortamate (hydrocortisone 21-(diethylamino)acetate)
 Hydrocortisone aceponate (hydrocortisone 21-acetate 17α-propionate)
 Hydrocortisone acetate
 Hydrocortisone bendazac
 Hydrocortisone buteprate (hydrocortisone 17α-butyrate 21-propionate)
 Hydrocortisone butyrate (hydrocortisone 17α-butyrate)
 Hydrocortisone 21-butyrate
 Hydrocortisone cypionate (hydrocortisone cyclopentanepropionate)
 Hydrocortisone phosphate
 Hydrocortisone succinate (hydrocortisone hemisuccinate)
 Hydrocortisone tebutate
 Hydrocortisone valerate
 Hydrocortisone xanthogenic acid

Esters of other natural corticosteroids

 11-Dehydrocorticosterone acetate
 Cortifen (cortodoxone chlorphenacyl ester)
 Cortisone acetate
 Corticosterone acetate
 Corticosterone benzoate
 Cortodoxone acetate

Esters of synthetic corticosteroids

Beclometasone esters

 Beclometasone dipropionate (beclomethasone dipropionate)
 Beclometasone salicylate
 Beclometasone valeroacetate

Betamethasone esters

 Betamethasone acetate
 Betamethasone acibutate (betamethasone 21-acetate 17α-isobutyrate)
 Betamethasone adamantoate
 Betamethasone benzoate
 Betamethasone dipropionate
 Betamethasone divalerate
 Betamethasone phosphate (betamethasone phosphate)
 Betamethasone succinate
 Betamethasone valerate
 Betamethasone valeroacetate (betamethasone 21-acetate 17α-valerate)
 Cortobenzolone (betamethasone salicylate)

Clocortolone esters

 Clocortolone acetate
 Clocortolone caproate
 Clocortolone pivalate

Dexamethasone esters

 Dexamethasone acefurate
 Dexamethasone acetate (flumeprednisolone)
 Dexamethasone cipecilate
 Dexamethasone diethylaminoacetate
 Dexamethasone dipropionate
 Dexamethasone isonicotinate
 Dexamethasone linoleate
 Dexamethasone metasulphobenzoate
 Dexamethasone palmitate
 Dexamethasone phosphate
 Dexamethasone pivalate
 Dexamethasone succinate
 Dexamethasone sulfate
 Dexamethasone tebutate (dexamethasone tert-butylacetate)
 Dexamethasone troxundate
 Dexamethasone valerate

Fluocinolone acetonide esters

 Ciprocinonide (fluocinolone acetonide cyclopropylcarboxylate)
 Fluocinonide (fluocinolone acetonide 21-acetate)
 Procinonide (fluocinolone acetonide propionate)

Fluocortolone esters

 Fluocortin (fluocortolone-21-carboxylate)
 Fluocortin butyl (fluocortolone-21-carboxylate 21-butylate)
 Fluocortolone caproate
 Fluocortolone pivalate

Fluprednisolone esters

 Fluprednisolone acetate
 Fluprednisolone succinate (fluprednisolone hemisuccinate)
 Fluprednisolone valerate

Methylprednisolone esters

 Methylprednisolone aceponate
 Methylprednisolone acetate
 Methylprednisolone cyclopentylpropionate
 Methylprednisolone phosphate
 Methylprednisolone succinate (methylprednisolone hemisuccinate)
 Methylprednisolone suleptanate

Prednisolone esters

 Prednazate (prednisolone succinate and perphenazine compound)
 Prednazoline (prednisolone phosphate and fenoxazoline compound)
 Prednicarbate (prednisolone 17-(ethyl carbonate) 21-propionate)
 Prednimustine (prednisolone chlorambucil ester)
 Prednisolamate (prednisolone diethylaminoacetate)
 Prednisolone acetate
 Prednisolone hexanoate
 Prednisolone metasulphobenzoate (prednisolone 21-(3-sulfobenzoate))
 Prednisolone palmitate
 Prednisolone phosphate
 Prednisolone piperidinoacetate
 Prednisolone pivalate
 Prednisolone steaglate (prednisolone stearoyl-glycolate)
 Prednisolone stearoylglycolate
 Prednisolone succinate (prednisolone hemisuccinate)
 Prednisolone sulfate
 Prednisolone tebutate (prednisolone tert-butylacetate)
 Prednisolone tetrahydrophthalate
 Prednisolone valerate
 Prednisolone valeroacetate

Prednisone esters

 Prednisone acetate
 Prednisone palmitate
 Prednisone succinate

Tixocortol esters

 Butixocort (tixocortol butyrate)
 Butixocort propionate (tixocortol butyrate propionate)
 Tixocortol pivalate

Triamcinolone acetonide esters

 Flupamesone (triamcinolone acetonide metembonate)
 Triamcinolone acetonide phosphate
 Triamcinolone acetonide succinate (triamcinolone acetonide hemisuccinate)
 Triamcinolone benetonide (triamcinolone acetonide 21-(benzoyl-β-aminoisobutyrate))
 Triamcinolone furetonide (triamcinolone acetonide 21-(2-benzofurancarboxylate))
 Triamcinolone hexacetonide (triamcinolone acetonide 21-(tert-butylacetate))

Esters of other synthetic corticosteroids

 Δ7-Prednisolone 21-acetate
 Alclometasone dipropionate
 Amcinonide (triamcinolone acetate cyclopentanonide)
 Chloroprednisone acetate
 Ciclometasone (a corticosteroid 21-[4-[(acetylamino)methyl]cyclohexyl]carboxylate ester)
 Clobetasol propionate
 Clobetasone butyrate
 Cloprednol acetate
 Cormetasone acetate
 Cortivazol (a corticosteroid 21-acetate ester)
 Cloticasone propionate
 Deflazacort (a corticosteroid 21-acetate ester)
 Deprodone propionate
 Desonide phosphate
 Desonide pivalate
 Dichlorisone acetate
 Dichlorisone diacetate
 Diflorasone diacetate
 Diflucortolone pivalate
 Diflucortolone valerate
 Difluprednate (difluoroprednisolone butyrate acetate)
 Dimesone acetate
 Drocinonide phosphate
 Etiprednol dicloacetate
 Fluazacort (a corticosteroid 21-acetate ester)
 Fludrocortisone acetate
 Flumetasone acetate
 Flumetasone pivalate
 Flunisolide acetate
 Fluorometholone acetate
 Fluperolone acetate
 Fluprednidene acetate
 Fluticasone furoate
 Fluticasone propionate
 Formocortal (a corticosteroid 21-acetate ester)
 Halopredone acetate (halopredone diacetate)
 Icometasone enbutate
 Isoflupredone acetate
 Locicortolone dicibate
 Loteprednol etabonate
 Meclorisone dibutyrate
 Meprednisone acetate
 Meprednisone succinate (meprednisone hemisuccinate)
 Mometasone furoate
 Nicocortonide (a corticosteroid 21-isonicotinate ester)
 Nicocortonide acetate
 Paramethasone acetate
 Paramethasone phosphate
 Prebediolone acetate
 Prednylidene diethylaminoacetate
 Rofleponide palmitate
 Ticabesone propionate
 Timobesone acetate
 Triamcinolone aminobenzal benzamidoisobutyrate
 Triamcinolone diacetate
 Ulobetasol propionate (halobetasol propionate)

See also
 Steroid ester
 List of corticosteroid cyclic ketals
 List of corticosteroids
 List of steroid esters

References

Corticosteroid esters
Corticosteroids
Steroid esters
Glucocorticoids
Prodrugs